National Highway 28 (NH 28) is a  National Highway in India. This highway runs entirely in the state of Uttar Pradesh. It provides main connectivity form India to Nepal.

Route 
Kakrahwa on India-Nepal border,  Siddharthnagar, Bansi, Rudhauli, Basti, Tanda, Atraulia, Azamgarh, Katghar, Lalganj, Lamhi, Varanasi.

Districts
Siddharthnagar, Basti, Ambedkar Nagar, Azamgarh, Varanasi.

Junctions
  near Siddharthnagar.
  near Basti.
  near Nyori.
  Terminal near Varanasi.

Notes and references

External links
 NH 28 on OpenStreetMap

National Highways in Uttar Pradesh
Transport in Varanasi district